The South Burnett Rugby League is a competition played in Queensland, Australia under the auspices of the Queensland Rugby League Central Division.

Clubs

First Grade
 Cherbourg Hornets
 Kingaroy Red Ants
 Murgon Mustangs
 Wondai Wolves

Juniors
 Nanango Stags
 Cherbourg Hornets
 Kingaroy Red Ants
 Murgon Mustangs
 Wondai Wolves

Premiers
Grand Final results compiled from scores published in the Rugby League Week.

References

External Links and Sources
 Rugby League Week at State Library of NSW Research and Collections
 The centenary of the greatest game under the sun : one hundred years of Rugby League in Queensland, Prof. Maxwell Howell, Celebrity Books, 2008.
 History of the South Burnett Rugby League on Facebook

Queensland Rugby League
South Burnett Region